WBMJ (1190 AM) is a radio station broadcasting a Religious format. Licensed to San Juan, Puerto Rico, it serves the Puerto Rico area.  The station is currently owned by Calvary Evangelistic Mission, Inc. and features programming from Salem Communications.

WBMJ's programming is also heard on translator station W258DT 99.5 FM, also licensed to San Juan.

WBMJ is one of three AM stations that comprise The Rock Radio Network.  The station's studio facilities are in Santurce, Puerto Rico.  The facilities serve as the hub of the Network, and most of the Networks's programming originates from there. The transmitter is in Barrio Camarones, in Guaynabo, Puerto Rico. It is operated with a 10,000-watt Nautel transmitter and broadcasts in a directional pattern.  For more information on WBMJ, see The Rock Radio Network.

WBMJ broadcasts in a Religious format.  Its programming is bilingual and consists largely of biblical teaching in English and in Spanish. WBMJ also broadcasts a limited amount of Christian music.  It serves as the Puerto Rico affiliate of the Salem Radio Network News agency.  WBMJ is also the site of the Bible Correspondence School of the Caribbean.

Early history
WBMJ was owned by Bob Hope’s Mid-Ocean Broadcasting Company, and set up by its excellent General Manager, the late Bob Bennett in 1967-1968. With its distinctive sound and top modulation, the station was frequently picked up as far away as Norway. WBMJ signed on in 1968, under Bob Bennett, who continued to manage the station through 1980, when Bob Hope's Mid Ocean sold to record impresario Jerry Masucci.

Bob Bennett was a veteran of U.S. Top 40 radio when he moved to Puerto Rico and started building WBMJ. The station was simply another iteration of the proven Top 40 format from the mainland. Since the island of Puerto Rico is a U.S. territory, it was natural to use mainland announcers and jingles and, of course, follow religiously the Billboard record charts. The original deejays who signed the station on the air in 1968 were Charlie Brown, Ric Roberts, and Bobby West. Program director Bill Thompson and station manager Bob Bennett would do a stint on the air from time to time as well. Commercials were in English, primarily, though a few were in Spanish. Often, a mixture of English and Spanish ("Spanglish") was used by the announcers for broad appeal to the station's culturally divergent audience.

From 1968 to roughly 1972, WBMJ was an American hits Top 40 station. The reasoning for the format was simple: all through Latin America, American music was popular. A really tightly done Top 40 with U.S. hits would be an attractive proposition. The station became instantly popular with its young target demographic, as it was the first broadcasting outlet to bring mainland Top 40 hits to the island.  The programming was divided between standard shifts, or day parts. and each shift was helmed by one DJ who was expected to create his own brand and find sponsors to support it, in effect paying their own salary.  The March 17, 1973 Billboard Magazine reports that "WBMJ, [a] Top 40 station in Puerto Rico, now has Bob Bennett 6-9 a.m., Charlie Brown until 1 p.m., Phil Baker 1-4 p.m., Marty Mald 4-7 p.m., and Moonshadow 7-signoff, with Karl (Scott Brady) Phillips doing weekends."  Phillips is notable because he was an active-duty U.S. Navy member at the time and did the work more for amusement than for pay.  Others, such as popular WBMJ DJ Harry Sherwood, leveraged their visibility to augment their income.  Sherwood became recognized all over the Caribbean as the voice for Eastern Airlines.

In 1972, WBMJ switched to Spanish jocks  and a mix of 90% English music with some Spanish pop hits, under the name of Radio Rock. Radio Rock became the number one radio station in San Juan very quickly, staying there through much of the rest of the '70s, challenged seriously only by WKAQ with its Spanish Top 40. WBMJ became a salsa oldies station around 1981 as Exitos 1190 and then, eventually, became religious under the ownership of the operators of WIVV from Puerto Rico's Vieques Island.

Translator stations

References

External links
FCC History Cards for WBMJ

Personal accounts of former WBMJ jocks
Listen to 4 of WBMJ's jingles included in the PAMS ”Series 18” ”Sonosational” jingles.

BMJ
BMJ
Radio stations established in 1968
1968 establishments in Puerto Rico